Yeu Muslim (born 25 December 1998) is a Cambodian footballer who plays as a midfielder for Phnom Penh Crown and the Cambodia national team.

Club career
Yeu was promoted to the Phnom Penh Crown first team in 2015, winning a Cambodian League title in his first season. He made his AFC Cup debut in 2017, playing in both legs of their 3–7 aggregate defeat to Home United.

In January 2020 he signed a two-year contract extension. During the 2020 season, he was forced to spend time at right-back due to the number of talented midfielders on the squad.

International career
Yeu represented the Cambodian national under-19 team at the 2016 AFF U-19 Youth Championship in Vietnam. He also played for the Cambodian national under-23 team at the 2019 Southeast Asian Games and the 2020 AFC U-23 Championship qualification phase.

He earned his first senior international cap for Cambodia on 9 March 2019, playing the full 90 minutes in a 1–0 friendly loss to Bangladesh. He came off the bench for two appearances during the second round of 2022 World Cup qualification.

International statistics

Honours

Club
Phnom Penh Crown
Cambodian Premier League: 2015, 2021, 2022
Cambodian Super Cup: 2022
Cambodian League Cup: 2022

References

External links
 
 
 
 

Living people
1998 births
Cambodian footballers
Cambodia international footballers
Association football midfielders
Phnom Penh Crown FC players
People from Kandal province